Matt Kaskey (born March 17, 1997) is an American football offensive tackle for the Birmingham Stallions of the United States Football League (USFL). He played college football at Dartmouth and was signed by the Los Angeles Rams as an undrafted free agent in 2019.

Early life
At New Trier High School, Kaskey played for the football and basketball teams. In 2014, New Trier reached the Class 8A state playoffs with an 8–1 record; Kaskey led the team as a captain and was named to the All-Chicagoland, all-conference, and all-area first-teams at the conclusion of the season. In addition to football, Kaskey also participated in track, lacrosse, and wrestling during his high school career.

College career
Kaskey attended Dartmouth, where he played offensive tackle for the football program for four years, beginning in 2015. In his freshman season, Kaskey played in eight games, starting one, mostly at left tackle. In Kaskey's sophomore season, he started eight games and was named an All-Ivy honorable mention for his work at left tackle, where he would play for the rest of his collegiate career. Kaskey started all ten games in his junior season, and was named to the All-Ivy League First-team. He was also chosen as the recipient of the team's Jake Crouthamel Award, which is awarded to the underclassman who contributes the most to the success of the team. In his senior season, in which he was named  a captain, Kaskey started in all ten of the Big Green's games, leading an offensive line unit that allowed just seven sacks and powered a rushing attack which averaged 254 yards a game.

Kaskey graduated from Dartmouth with a degree in history.

Professional career

Los Angeles Rams
Kaskey signed with the Los Angeles Rams as an undrafted free agent following the 2019 NFL Draft. On August 31, 2019, Kaskey was released by the Rams as part of final roster cuts.

Carolina Panthers
On September 24, 2019, Kaskey was signed to the Carolina Panthers practice squad. On November 12, Kaskey was released by the team, but re-signed on December 4. He was promoted to the active roster on December 21, 2019.

On September 6, 2020, Kaskey was waived by the Panthers and re-signed to the practice squad the next day. He was elevated to the active roster on December 19 and 26 for the team's weeks 15 and 16 games against the Green Bay Packers and Washington Football Team, and reverted to the practice squad after each game. He was promoted to the active roster on December 28, 2020.

On August 17, 2021, Kaskey was waived/injured and placed on injured reserve. He was released on December 21.

Birmingham Stallions
Kaskey signed with the Birmingham Stallions of the USFL on December 13, 2022.

References

External links
 Dartmouth bio
 Carolina Panthers bio

1997 births
Living people
Players of American football from Illinois
Sportspeople from Cook County, Illinois
American football offensive tackles
Dartmouth Big Green football players
Los Angeles Rams players
People from Winnetka, Illinois
Carolina Panthers players
New Trier High School alumni
Birmingham Stallions (2022) players